Clarence Willie "Pete" Fahrer (March 10, 1890 – June 10, 1967) was a pitcher in Major League Baseball. He played for the Cincinnati Reds in 1914.

References

External links

1890 births
1967 deaths
Major League Baseball pitchers
Cincinnati Reds players
Baseball players from Ohio
Battle Creek Crickets players
Charlotte Hornets (baseball) players
Dayton Veterans players
People from Henry County, Ohio